The 2021 West Virginia Mountaineers football team represented West Virginia University during the current 2021 NCAA Division I FBS football season. The Mountaineers played their home games at the Milan Puskar Stadium in Morgantown, West Virginia, and competed in the Big 12 Conference. The team was led by third-year head coach Neal Brown.

Previous season

The Mountaineers finished the 2020 regular season 6–4 and 4–4 in Big 12 play to finish sixth in the conference. They were eligible to play in the post season and was invited to play in the 2020 Liberty Bowl against the Army Black Knights. West Virginia won the game by three points against the Black Knights.

Schedule 
The 2021 schedule consists of 6 home and 6 away games in the regular season.

Schedule Source:

Game Summaries

at Maryland

LIU

Rankings

Coaching staff

References

West Virginia
West Virginia Mountaineers football seasons
West Virginia Mountaineers football